Stoney Nakoda First Nation is a Nakoda First Nations band government Alberta, Canada. It is located West of Calgary, in the foot of the Rocky Mountains.

Stoney Nakoda First Nation comprises three Nakoda Tribes:
 Bearspaw First Nation Band No. 473
 Chiniki First Nation  Band No. 433
 Wesley First Nation  Band No. 475

Bearspaw First Nation

The Bearspaw First Nation is a First Nations band government of the Nakoda people in Alberta. This nation is part of the larger Stoney Nakoda First Nation.

In November 2010, a dispute arose when the chief of the band, David Bearspaw, cancelled a forthcoming election and extended his term by two years, prompting a protest blockade of the Eden Valley 216 reserve by other band members.  A judge ordered elections to go ahead, and the incumbent was defeated by Darcy Dixon.

Chiniki First Nation

The Chiniki First Nation is a First Nations band government of the Nakoda people in Alberta. This nation is part of the larger Stoney Nakoda First Nation.

Goodstoney First Nation

The Wesley First Nation is a First Nations band government of the Nakoda people in Alberta. This nation is part of the larger Stoney Nakoda First Nation.

Reserves

Indian Reserves shared between the three component nations, under the administration of the Stoney Nakoda First Nation are: 
 Stoney 142, 143, 144, 56 km West of Calgary, 39264.50 ha 
 Stoney 142B, 48 km Northwest of Calgary, 5692.40 ha 
 Big Horn 144A, All That Parcel or Tract of Land Situated Lying & Being In Twp 39, RGE16, W5M, 2127.40 ha 
 Eden Valley 216, 80 km Southwest of Calgary, 1690.80 ha

See also 
Stoney Language
Nakoda people
Treaty 7

References 

Calgary Region
Plains tribes
Nakoda (Stoney)